Sachi Koto born in Atlanta, Georgia, is a third-generation Japanese American. She was a news anchor on CNN News for 16 years, until leaving In 2005, to run her own communications company, Sachi Koto Communications, LLC. Koto worked at various radio and television stations in Atlanta and Tokyo for nine years before joining CNN. While she was with CNN, she reported for CNN Headline News, CNN Radio, CNN Airport Network, CNN International, CNN QuickCast and Turner South.

She graduated, summa cum laude, with a degree in communications from Reinhardt College in Waleska, Georgia, as a presidential scholar. She also has a degree in Japanese Language and Culture from Gendai Nihongo Gakko in Tokyo, Japan.

Koto was appointed as commissioner to the Asian-American Commission for a new Georgia, by Governor Sonny Perdue, and is a founder of Who's Who in Asian American Communities.

In 2021, Koto received the Order of the Rising Sun, Gold Rays with Rosette in recognition of her "outstanding contribution to promoting exchange and mutual understanding between Japan and the United States".

References

Living people
People from Clarkston, Georgia
American television reporters and correspondents
American women journalists of Asian descent
American writers of Japanese descent
Reinhardt University alumni
1951 births
CNN people
20th-century American journalists
American women television journalists
20th-century American women
21st-century American women
Recipients of the Order of the Rising Sun, 4th class